Kirk Black (born  in Texas) is an American wheelchair curler.

He participated in the 2018 Winter Paralympics, where the American team finished in twelfth place.

Teams

References

External links 

Kirk BLACK - Athlete Profile - World Para Nordic Skiing - Live results | International Paralympic Committee

Kirk Black - Move United
 Video: 

Living people
1969 births
People from Texas
American male curlers
American disabled sportspeople
American wheelchair curlers
Paralympic wheelchair curlers of the United States
Wheelchair curlers at the 2018 Winter Paralympics